Anna Konstam (22 February 1914 – 21 November 1982) was a British theatre and film actress.

She appeared in the comedy Love in a Mist at St Martin's Theatre in 1941. She also played roles at Stratford in 1942–43, including Desdemona in Othello, Olivia in Twelfth Night and Hermione in The Winter's Tale.

Partial filmography
 Young and Innocent (1937) - Elsie - Bathing Girl (uncredited)
 They Drive by Night (1938) - Molly O'Neill
 Too Dangerous to Live (1939) - Lou
 The Midas Touch (1940) - Mamie
 Saloon Bar (1940) - Ivy
 Waterloo Road (1945) - May
 All the Advantages (1972) - (final film role)

Selected theatre appearances
 The Last Straw by Reginald Denham (1937)
 Saloon Bar by Frank Harvey (1939)
 Love in a Mist by Kenneth Horne (1941)

References

External links
 

British stage actresses
British film actresses
1914 births
1982 deaths
Actresses from London
20th-century British actresses
20th-century English women
20th-century English people